The women's long jump event at the 2016 Summer Olympics took place between 16–17 August at the Olympic Stadium.

Summary
In the final, Malaika Mihambo jumped 6.83 m as the first athlete down the runway. The second jumper was Darya Klishina, the only Russian athlete in the entire athletics competition. Her 6.63 took the second spot. Ksenija Balta jumped 6.71 m as the fourth athlete but that order held until almost the end of the round when Ivana Španović moved on top with 6.95 m. 

In the second round Tianna Bartoletta moved into silver medal position with a 6.94 m. Defending champion Brittney Reese jumped a 6.79 m, her only legal jump of the first four rounds, but remained outside of the medals. In the third round, Bartoletta's 1 cm improvement to 6.95 m equalled Španović, with the tiebreaker to put her in gold medal position. On the next jump, Balta equalled Reese, with the same tiebreaker rule pushing her into fifth place. 

The fifth round had the real action. First Reese jumped 7.09 to leap from fifth to first. Her mood went from serious to jubilant. Mihambo jumped the third 6.95 of the competition. Then Španović moved right behind Reese with a 7.08 m, her personal best and a new Serbian national record. 

On the final jump of the round, Bartoletta jumped the winner , her personal best in the Olympic final.  She moved up to be the number 21 performer in history. Only Reese has jumped further in the last nine years. But Reese wasn't done. She popped another big jump on her last attempt. She was celebrating again, but the measurement turned out to be 7.15 m, improving her hold on silver but didn't reach Bartoletta's gold.

The following evening the medals were presented by Auvita Rapilla, IOC member, Papua New Guinea and Svein Arne Hansen, Council Member of the IAAF.

Competition format
The competition consisted of two rounds, qualification and final. In qualification, each athlete jumped three times (stopping early if they made the qualifying distance). At least the top twelve athletes moved on to the final; if more than twelve reached the qualifying distance, all who did so advanced. Distances were reset for the final round. Finalists jumped three times, after which the eight best jumped three more times (with the best distance of the six jumps counted).

Records
, the existing World and Olympic records were as follows.

The following national record was established during the competition:

Schedule
All times are Brasilia Time (UTC-3)

Qualifying round
Qualification rule: qualification standard 6.75m (Q) or at least best 12 qualified (q).

Final

References

Women's long jump
2016
2016 in women's athletics
Women's events at the 2016 Summer Olympics